Public School No. 111, also known as Francis Ellen Harper School, is a historic elementary school located at Baltimore, Maryland, United States. It is a Romanesque brick structure that features an ornately detailed brick front façade. It was built in 1889 as Colored School #9 and is one of the few surviving schools built for black children and staffed by black teachers. The school is named after Francis Ellen Harper (1825-1911), a Baltimore-born African American poet.

Public School No. 111 was listed on the National Register of Historic Places in 1979.

References

External links
, including photo from 2004, at Maryland Historical Trust

Defunct schools in Maryland
Public schools in Baltimore
School buildings on the National Register of Historic Places in Baltimore
School buildings completed in 1889
Historically black schools
African-American history in Baltimore
Historically segregated African-American schools in Maryland
Sandtown-Winchester, Baltimore
1889 establishments in Maryland